Fiorenza Sommaripa (died after 1520) was a Latin noblewoman of the Aegean islands.

Life
She was a daughter of Nicolò I Sommaripa and his spouse, a woman from the da Pesaro family, whose first name is unknown.

She married in 1479 the Venetian Zuan Francesco Venier, Co-Lord of Cerigo (died 1518).

Her brother Crusino succeeded their father in Paros at the latter's death ca. 1505. He died without issue in late 1517 or early 1518; since he hated her, he had bequeathed the island to a relative, Polimeno Sommaripa.
 
The island of Paros was thus disputed among several pretenders, including the Duke of Naxos who claimed it as its overlord after the extinction of its successoral line. However, the Republic of Venice did not wish to see Paros incorporated with Naxos and took it from Naxos claiming that Venice would hold it until the matter of succession could be solved by a senate of experts in Venice.

The senate decided in July 1520 that Fiorenza Venier was its rightful heir and attributed the island to her, which introduced a Venetian dynasty in Paros. She gave the island to her son the same year.

Issue 
 Nicolò Venier, Lord of Paros, lord in 1520-1530.   
 Cecilia Venier, lady in 1531-1537.

References

Fiorenza
House of Venier
Fiorenza
Year of birth unknown
16th-century women rulers